Castle Dome is a  elevation Navajo Sandstone summit located in Zion National Park, in Washington County of southwest Utah, United States. It is set on the west side of the North Fork Virgin River which drains precipitation runoff from this mountain. It is wedged between Behunin Canyon and Heaps Canyon, with the popular Emerald Pools set at the southeast foot of this mountain. Its neighbors include Mount Majestic, Cathedral Mountain, The Great White Throne, Red Arch Mountain, Mountain of the Sun, and Lady Mountain. This feature's name was officially adopted in 1934 by the U.S. Board on Geographic Names.

Climate
Spring and fall are the most favorable seasons to visit Castle Dome. According to the Köppen climate classification system, it is located in a Cold semi-arid climate zone, which is defined by the coldest month having an average mean temperature below 32 °F (0 °C), and at least 50% of the total annual precipitation being received during the spring and summer.

Gallery

See also

 List of mountains in Utah
 Geology of the Zion and Kolob canyons area
 Colorado Plateau

References

External links

 Zion National Park National Park Service
 Weather forecast: Castle Dome
 Castle Dome rock climbing: Mountainproject.com

Mountains of Utah
Zion National Park
Mountains of Washington County, Utah
Sandstone formations of the United States
Colorado Plateau
North American 2000 m summits